Zafar Ali may refer to:
 Zafar Ali (Indian cricketer) (born 1987)
 Zafar Ali (Pakistani cricketer) (born 1986)
 Zafar Ali (politician), Bangladeshi politician